Óscar Tulio Lizcano (born 1947) is a Colombian conservative politician and a member of the Colombia Conservative Party who was a congressman for the Department of Caldas (a position now taken by his son).  On August 5, 2000, while serving as congressman, Lizcano was kidnapped in Riosucio, Caldas, by the Revolutionary Armed Forces of Colombia (FARC) guerrilla group and held for 8 years. On October 23, 2008, he escaped captivity with the help of one of his jailers who took the decision to desert due to the immense pressure inflicted by the Colombian army on the rebel group.

According to correspondence sent by Lizcano he was continuously moved through different guerrilla camps in the Caldas countryside and was suffering from malaria.

See also
Kidnappings in Colombia
List of political hostages held by FARC
FARC-EP

References

External links
  El Colombiano: Letters of Oscar Tulio Lizcano
  Ministry of Justice: Sentence T-307/02
 HRW: letter of Jose Miguel Vivanco to FARC regarding Oscar Tulio Lizcano

1947 births
Colombian Conservative Party politicians
Colombian economists
Members of the Chamber of Representatives of Colombia
Kidnapped Colombian people
Kidnapped politicians
Living people